Dmitriyevka is a rural locality (a selo) and the administrative center of Dmitriyevskoye Rural Settlement, Rakityansky District, Belgorod Oblast, Russia. The population was 880 as of 2010. There are 6 streets.

Geography 
Dmitriyevka is located 18 km southeast of Rakitnoye (the district's administrative centre) by road. Ivenka is the nearest rural locality.

References 

Rural localities in Rakityansky District
Grayvoronsky Uyezd